Bathtub refinishing also known as bathtub resurfacing, bathtub reglazing or bathtub re-enameling is the process of refreshing the surface of a worn, damaged bathtub to a like-new condition. This process typically involves removing the drain(An important step that improves coating life-span but is not always possible) and repairing any damaged areas, including checking to see if the bathtub holds water after draining. Chips or cracks are repaired using Bondo or another type of polyester putty. After repairs are made the surface is prepped with an acid etching. Etching and wet sanding provide mechanical adhesion and clean the surface. Porcelain, enamel, and fiberglass tubs are non-porous and do not provide a good substrate for the new coating to attach to. Etching the surface provides a porous surface that will allow proper adhesion. Another possible method is to apply an adhesion-promoting bonding agent like silane to the surface before applying the coating.  The two methods can be used in unison or independently. The greatest adhesion is generally achieved by using both methods together however, some newer refinishing processes claim they do not require the use of etching, by relying on silane alone. After preparing the surface, Prior to spraying any chemical coatings, most refinishers will protect themselves and their clients by completely masking the areas that can be affected by overspray and setting up a professional exhaust system rated to work with the type of coating system being applied.  This is important for many reasons, the greatest being a possible fire or explosion hazard.  Then the refinisher will use a NIOSH-rated fresh-air supplied breathing apparatus to and spray suite and gloves to protect themselves from the chemicals being used in the process.  They also provide assistance with the quality of the spraying.  By using at least a 1200-cfm exhaust unit, the refinisher can see better and may limit the overspray and settling on the surface.     primer (if used), is then applied, followed by a topcoat.   Generally, a catalyzed two-component cross-link synthetic white coating is applied, but the coating does not have the durability or abrasive tolerance of the original glass-enamel coating of a factory-new bathtub.  The coating should be in most cases between 5-8 mils in thickness when cured to provide the best, longterm results.  This is typically achieved by spraying 2-coats of primer, and 3-coats of top-coat.  A very experienced refinisher may be able to accomplish this with fewer coats depending on conditions.

After spraying is complete, the refinisher will pick up the equipment and remove the masking and garbage from the home.  A new caulk line can be installed and the drain replaced.

Coatings used to create a new bathtub finish can be epoxies, urethanes, hybrid polyester-polyurethane, or polymers. These coatings may be rolled, brushed, or sprayed on.

Bathtub refinishing is possible using DIY kits from hardware stores, but some may choose a professional service company offering refinishing services. DIY kits generally do not offer the same level of bonding and thus, deteriorate more quickly, relying primarily on epoxy adhesion. Without professional spray equipment, the final aesthetic look may show brush or roller marks.

Slipping resistance can be added to the bathtub coating to provide a slip-resistant area to the bottom of the tub during the refinishing process as well.  In general, when professionally refinished using professional products, the surface with act as a new tub surface and be very slippery when wet.  There are also semi-permanent mats available on the market that stick to the surface.  They may be more difficult to clean and do not have the life expectancy of many coating systems.  Rubber mats are almost always discouraged by the manufactures and they tend to void the warranty in various ways.

Suction-cup mats cause water to be trapped.  Water is also commonly trapped under bottles and toys.  Sometimes, Bathtubs have manufacture defects or even settle in unexpected ways causing water to not drain from the surface.  All of these issues will generally cause the coating to delaminate(peel) over time.  anything that can keep the surface wet and not allow for dry time after use will be a problem.  In most cases, the refinisher will be able to tell why a surface is peeling and will not repair the surface under warranty these instances.

Hazards
Findings from the Fatality Assessment and Control Evaluation (FACE) program have identified at least 14 worker deaths since 2000 related to the usage of methylene chloride for bathtub refinishing. Products containing high percentages of methylene chloride are used as stripping agents in the process, to remove the old coating on the bathtubs.  In an unventilated setting, overexposure to methylene chloride vapors can affect brain function and result in death in the short term, with possible carcinogenic effects in the long term.

Measures to prevent overexposure to methylene chloride include the use of stripping agents relying on other chemicals instead, the implementation of adequate local exhaust ventilation, and the provision of appropriate personal protective equipment (i.e. respirators). Using long-handled tools can also decrease workers' proximity from the product, with beneficial effects.

Professional refinishers will often provide the end-user with after-care instructions and warranty or guaranty information.  Pay attention to the cleaning and care recommendations to avoid warranty issues.  Cleaning in most cases can be best accomplished using a mild dish-soap degreaser like Dawn(Be sure to avoid cleaners with acids or other chemicals the manufacture recommends avoiding).  Plugging the tub to hold some water to cover the bottom, mix some cleaner in and agitate, then rub the surface with the sponge.  For best results or to clean especially dirty tubs, let the cleaner sit on the surface for up to 20-minutes.  This allows the cleaner to break down the dirt and oils to be more easily removed.  Waxing the surface around the drain, and in other areas that are not stood or sat on can also assist in keeping the surface like new and improve coating life.  Special to note in the cleaning is the caulk line.  Take care not to rub on the caulk to the point that it becomes no longer adhered to the tub or wall surface.  This will allow water to become trapped and cause peeling.  Damaged caulk should always be replaced immediately.

See also
 Bathroom
 Bathtub
 Home improvement
 Home repair
 Hot tub
 Jacuzzi
 Shower

References

External links
OSHA/NIOSH Hazard Alert: Methylene Chloride Hazards for Bathtub Refinishers
OSHA/NIOSH Hazard Alert: Bathpoints for Bathtub Refinishers

Home improvement
Maintenance
Reuse